The 1932 George Washington Colonials football team was an American football team that represented George Washington University as an independent during the 1932 college football season. In its fourth season under head coach Jim Pixlee, the team compiled a 6–2–1 record and outscored opponents by a total of 149 to 76. In intersectional play, the team defeated Iowa, tied with Oklahoma, and lost to Alabama and Tulsa.

When Iowa traveled to Washington, D.C., for its game with George Washington, coach Pixlee requested that Iowa withhold its two African-American players from the game and also not allow them to enter the dressing room or sit on the bench.  Iowa coach Ossie Solem agreed that the two would not play but refused the other requests, stating "there isn't anyone big enough in Washington to keep me from taking all my players into the dressing room and onto the playing field."

Schedule

References

George Washington
George Washington Colonials football seasons
George Washington Colonials football